Walter Konrad (born 4 July 1928) is a German long-distance runner. He competed in the men's 10,000 metres at the 1956 Summer Olympics.

References

External links
 

1928 births
Possibly living people
Athletes (track and field) at the 1956 Summer Olympics
German male long-distance runners
Olympic athletes of the United Team of Germany
Sportspeople from Merano